Symmorium is a dubious genus of extinct stethacanthid holocephalian from the Devonian and Carboniferous of the United States (Illinois) and Russia. The type species, Symmorium reniforme, was named by Edward Drinker Cope in 1893 and several other species were originally classed under this genus, but they have since been classified into other genera such as Petalodus. Symmorium bears close similarity in size and appearance to Stethacanthus but the former is missing the "spine and brush" on its back. Some paleontologists think that the two forms are simply the males and females of related species, while other scientists think they were distinct genera.

References

Symmoriiformes
Fossils of Russia
Fossils of the United States
Fossil taxa described in 1893